Michael Palm Toft (born 26 July 1990) is a Danish speedway rider.

Career
Palm Toft began his British career riding for the Scunthorpe Scorpions in 2011. The following year he helped Scunthorpe win the 2012 Premier League title In 2017, he captained Scunthorpe for the season.

In 2021, he rode in the top tier of British Speedway, riding for the Peterborough Panthers in the SGB Premiership 2021, in addition to the Redcar Bears in the SGB Championship 2021. He rode at No 1 in the Peterborough team that won the SGB Premiership 2021.

In 2022, he rode for the Peterborough again, in the SGB Premiership 2022 and for the Plymouth Gladiators in the SGB Championship 2022. In 2023, he returned to two previous clubs signing for King's Lynn Stars for the SGB Premiership 2023 and the Scunthorpe Scorpions for the SGB Championship 2023.

References 

1990 births
Living people
Danish speedway riders
Belle Vue Aces riders
King's Lynn Stars riders
Leicester Lions riders
Peterborough Panthers riders
Plymouth Devils riders
Plymouth Gladiators speedway riders
Redcar Bears riders
Scunthorpe Scorpions riders
Somerset Rebels riders
Sportspeople from Odense